Ethnic Notions is a 1987 documentary film directed by Marlon Riggs. It examines anti-Black stereotypes that permeated popular culture from the ante-bellum period until the advent of the Civil Rights Movement of the 1960s.

Content
Ethnic Notions takes viewers on a disturbing voyage through American history, tracing for the deep-rooted stereotypes which have fueled anti-Black prejudice. Through these images we can begin to understand the evolution of racial consciousness in the United States.

Ethnic Notions exposes and describes common stereotypes (The Tom, The Sambo, The Mammy, The Coon, The Brute, The Pickaninnies, The Minstrels) from the period surrounding the Civil War and the World Wars. The  stereotypes roll across the screen in cartoons, feature films, popular songs, minstrel shows, advertisements, folklore, household artifacts, even children's rhymes. Narration by Esther Rolle and commentary by respected scholars [Barbara Christian, UC Berkeley; Pat Turner, University of Massachusetts, Boston; George Fredrickson, Stanford University; Leni Sloan: choreographer; Carlton Moss: University of California, Irvine; Lawrence Levine, University of California, Berkeley ] shed light on the origins and devastating consequences of 150 years of these dehumanizing caricatures. Widely influenced by Jim Crow, a dance to depict black people which was widely televised, people in small towns who never seen black people were easily influenced Jim Crow = dancing black carefree Sambo on television a plantation was depicted as a happy paradise Sambo is a happy black in their proper place.

The documentary touches upon issues of servility, sexuality, appearances, the "noble" savage, and most evidently the impact of mass media on the image of the African Americans—especially the exaggerated physical image of a very dark person, with very bright large lips, very white eyes and large unkempt hair—and how this affects the self-image of the African American.  The insidious images exacted a devastating toll on Black Americans.

Reception
Ethnic Notions has become a mainstay of university, high school, and public library collections and the most widely seen of Marlon Riggs’ work.  It won an Emmy Award in 1988.

References

Sources
 Grant, Nancy. Rev. of Ethnic Notions. The Constitution and American Life. Ed. David Thelen. Spec. issue of Journal of American History 74.3 (December 1987): 1107–09.
 Leer, David Van. "Visible Silence: Spectatorship in Black Gay and Lesbian Film." Representing Blackness: Issues in Film and Video. Ed. Valerie Smith. New Brunswick, NJ: Rutgers UP, 1997. 157–82.
Welcome to Adelphi University | Kanopy, Marlon Riggs, 1987, adelphi.kanopy.com/video/ethnic-notions-0.

Documentary films about African Americans
Documentary films about racism in the cinema of the United States
Films directed by Marlon Riggs
1980s English-language films